Yi Dongnyeong (also spelled Yi Dong-nyung) was a Korean independence activist. He served as the fourth (1926), seventh (1927–1930), eighth (1930–1933), tenth (1935–1939), and eleventh (1939–1940) President of the Provisional Government of the Republic of Korea in exile in Shanghai, China.

Yi Dongnyeong, along with Yi Si-yeong, Yi Hoe-young and Yi Sang-ryong, started the Military School of the New Rising (Sinheung Mugwan Hakkyo 신흥무관학교) or Shinheung Military Academy in 1911.

He then took part in the establishment of an interim government, leading a provisional government in China for much of his life.

He died at 4:40pm on 13 March 1940, on the second floor of the Provisional Government headquarters in Chongqing. He had spent ten days in bed, suffering from pneumonia, and had previously suffered from asthma for years before his death.

Notes

Korean independence activists
Korean nationalists
1869 births
1940 deaths
Yi clan of Yonan